Michael Stich was the defending champion, but chose not to participate that year.

Richard Krajicek won in the final 7–6(7–5), 6–4, against Paul Haarhuis.

Seeds

  (withdrew)
  Yevgeny Kafelnikov (semifinals)
  Wayne Ferreira (second round)
  Andrei Medvedev (quarterfinals)
  Richard Krajicek (champion)
  Jacco Eltingh (first round)
  Slava Doseděl (second round)
  Karel Nováček (first round)

Draw

Finals

Top half

Bottom half

External links
 Draw

Singles
1995 ATP Tour